Diamond Cut Diamond is a 1932 British comedy crime film directed by Maurice Elvey and Fred Niblo and starring Adolphe Menjou, Claud Allister and Benita Hume. It was made at Elstree Studios by the independent producer Eric Hakim.

Plot
One of the guests tries to foil a gang of jewel-robbers during a country house weekend party.

Cast
 Adolphe Menjou as Dan McQueen 
 Claud Allister as Joe Fragson 
 Benita Hume as Marda Blackett 
 Kenneth Kove as Reggie Dean 
 Desmond Jeans as Blackett 
 G.D. Manetta as Head Waiter 
 Roland Gillett as Cloak Room Attendant 
 Toni Edgar-Bruce as Miss Loftus 
 Shayle Gardner as Spellman

References

External links

Bibliography
 Low, Rachael. Filmmaking in 1930s Britain. George Allen & Unwin, 1985.
 Wood, Linda. British Films, 1927-1939. British Film Institute, 1986.

1932 films
1930s English-language films
Films directed by Maurice Elvey
Films directed by Fred Niblo
1930s crime comedy films
British crime comedy films
British black-and-white films
Films set in England
Films shot at Imperial Studios, Elstree
1932 comedy films
1930s British films